Rob "Sloot" Slotemaker (13 June 1929 in Batavia – 16 September 1979 in Zandvoort) was a Dutch racing driver.

He entered one Formula One World Championship race, the 1962 Dutch Grand Prix, with one of Carel Godin de Beaufort's Porsches, but his car was not ready in time for the event. His entry was taken by Wolfgang Seidel. Throughout the 1960s Slotemaker competed in the 24 Hours of Le Mans race, and was a driver and advisor for the Le Mans film in 1970.

In 1956, he established his "Anti-skid" driving school at Zandvoort, which is still operating today.

On 16 September 1979, at the Circuit Park Zandvoort, Slotemaker was killed when he crashed his Chevrolet Camaro during the "Trophy of the Dunes" touring car race. His car spun on a patch of oil and collided with a course car parked alongside the track. Despite the relatively minor force of the accident, he suffered a broken neck and died instantly. A doctor in the course car was also injured.

A section of the circuit, the right-hander past Hunzerug, is named in his memory.

Complete Formula One World Championship results
(key)

References

1929 births
1979 deaths
Dutch racing drivers
Dutch Formula One drivers
Racing drivers who died while racing
Sport deaths in the Netherlands
People from Batavia, Dutch East Indies
24 Hours of Le Mans drivers
World Sportscar Championship drivers
European Touring Car Championship drivers